Fabricio Henricot (born 26 April 1990) is an Argentine professional footballer who plays as a goalkeeper for Defensores Unidos.

Career
Racing Club were a youth team of Henricot's. He began his senior career with Boca Unidos. He was an unused substitute six times in 2012–13 in Primera B Nacional, prior to making his professional bow in the following campaign in a 2–0 victory over San Martín on 6 June 2014. He remained with the club for four further seasons, making a total of forty-three appearances in all competitions. In July 2017, Henricot signed with fellow tier two outfit Instituto. He didn't appear competitively in 2017–18 as they reached the promotion play-offs; where they lost to Sarmiento. July 2019 saw Henricot join Douglas Haig.

Career statistics
.

References

External links

1990 births
Living people
People from Zárate Partido
Argentine footballers
Association football goalkeepers
Primera Nacional players
Torneo Federal A players
Boca Unidos footballers
Instituto footballers
Club Atlético Douglas Haig players
Deportivo Armenio footballers
Defensores Unidos footballers
Sportspeople from Buenos Aires Province